Mashdi ebad is a 1953 Azerbaijanian musical comedy film directed by Samad Sabahi.

Cast
 Ali Tabesh 
 Asghar Tafakori 
 Taghi Zohuri

References

External links 
 

1953 films
Iranian comedy films
Iranian musical films
Azerbaijani-language films in Iran
1953 musical comedy films
Iranian black-and-white films